The Ministry of Health in Saskatchewan is responsible for policy direction, sets and monitors standards, and provides funding for regional health authorities and provincial health services.

External links
Official Website of Saskatchewan
 Saskdocs Physician Recruitment Agency
eHealth Saskatchewan
3sHealth

Health ministers of Canada
Saskatchewan government ministries and agencies
Saskatchewan